The Gerhard Fieseler Werke (GFW) in Kassel was a German aircraft manufacturer of the 1930s and 1940s. The company is remembered mostly for its military aircraft built for the Luftwaffe during the Second World War.

History
The firm was founded on April 1, 1930 as Fieseler Flugzeugbau Kassel by World War I flying ace and aerobatic champion Gerhard Fieseler.  Fieseler had been a manager for the Raab-Katzenstein, but when this company went bankrupt, Fieseler bought a sailplane factory in Kassel and quickly turned it to building sports planes.  At the same time, Fieseler still custom-built sailplanes for some of Germany's most prominent designers and pilots, including Wolf Hirth's "Musterle" and Robert Kronfeld's "Wien" and "Austria" (for many years the largest sailplane ever built).

In 1934, the company achieved prominence when Fieseler won the World Aerobatics Championship in an aircraft his company had built, the F2 Tiger.  This was followed by the highly successful F5, generally regarded as a classic among sports planes.  Even greater success was to follow in 1936 when an aircraft of Fieseler's own design won a tender over aircraft from both Messerschmitt and Siebel for a new STOL observation and liaison aircraft for the Luftwaffe.  It was designated the Fieseler Fi 156 Storch (Stork), and the company would produce over 3,000 during World War II. In 1937 Fieseler also produced the Fieseler Fi 253.

On April 1, 1939 the company name changed to the Gerhard Fieseler Werke GmbH.

Fieseler's other wartime production would largely consist of building other firms' aircraft under licence, including the Messerschmitt Bf 109 and Focke-Wulf Fw 190.  In 1941 however, a Fieseler project for an unpiloted flying bomb (Fi 103) attracted the attention of the RLM (Reichsluftfahrtministerium - "Reich Aviation Ministry").  This went into production as the Fieseler FZG-76 (flakzielgerät, antiaircraft targeting device), better known as the V-1.

The Fieseler factory was the target of many Allied air raids, but continued production throughout the war. Following the War, part of the factory continued in business for a few years, producing automotive components. Its most famous products, the Storch and the V1, continued to be produced by foreign companies.

Aircraft 

Fieseler aircraft included:
 F2 Tiger acrobatic sportsplane, 1932
 F3 Wespe (Wasp) experimental flying wing, ca. 1931
 F5  acrobatic sportsplane + trainer, 1933
 Fi 97, competition and touring monoplane, 1934
 Fi 98, biplane fighter, 1936
 Fi 99, sport aircraft,
 Fi 103 (V-1)
 Fi 103 Reichenberg, piloted version of V-1
 Fi 156 Storch (Stork), STOL reconnaissance aircraft
 Fi 157, unmanned anti-aircraft target drone
 Fi 158, research aircraft
 Fi 166, vertical launched jet fighter
 Fi 167, ship-borne torpedo bomber and reconnaissance biplane
 Fi 168, ground-attack aircraft
 Fi 253, sport aircraft,
 Fi 333 transport (concept)

Gliders 
 Kassel 12, training glider,

See also

List of aircraft of the Luftwaffe, World War II
List of RLM aircraft designations
Volksflugzeug
Gerhard Fieselerx
Stall turn - the hammerhead turn, stall turn, or Fieseler an aerobatics turn-around maneuver

References

Defunct aircraft manufacturers of Germany